Erotic Massage is the title of Dog Fashion Disco's debut album, released in 1997.

Track listing

The Hidden Track is track number 27 on the original CD. Tracks 13 - 26 are blank. Tracks 2, 5 and 12 have appeared on later Dog Fashion Disco albums, in slightly different forms. Track 9 was covered by The Alter Boys. All other tracks are unique to this album, and as such, relatively difficult to find due to their out of print nature. It was announced in January 2017 that a remastered version will be released

Background
The album was released independently by the band in 1997. Like the following album, Experiments in Alchemy (also independent), the studio quality is rather poor. An original copy is worth upwards of $100 on eBay, or can be found in an online download, as it has never been re-released. However, a remastered version (with alternative album art) was released exclusively on vinyl LP for VIP members to the band's reunion which took place on May 31 and June 1, 2013. This LP does not include the hidden "Track 27".

Personnel
Source
Todd Smith - Vocals & Guitars
Greg Combs - Guitars
Steve Mears - Bass
John Ensminger:  Drums
Josh Gifford:  Trumpet
Dave Sislen: Saxophone

Additional personnel
Geoff Stewart: - Saxophone/Flute
James Halsey: - Synthesizer/Moog
Ken Willard: - G. Eye Joe sample

References

1997 debut albums
Dog Fashion Disco albums